Koanophyllon is a genus of plants in the family Asteraceae. They are perennials and shrubs (rarely vines or trees) and are native to South America, Central America, the West Indies, Mexico, with a few species range extending into the United States. The flowers are white to pinkish (rarely purple).

Cuba alone has 21 endemic species, seven of which only grow in serpentine soils, and some of which accumulate minerals such as nickel and manganese.

 Species

References 

 photo of herbarium specimen at Missouri Botanical Garden, collected in Brazil in 1880, identified as Koanophyllon tinctorium

 
Asteraceae genera
Taxonomy articles created by Polbot